The Gardener of Argenteuil (French: Le jardinier d'Argenteuil, German: Blüten, Gauner und die Nacht von Nizza) is a 1966 French-German comedy crime film directed by Jean-Paul Le Chanois and starring Jean Gabin, Liselotte Pulver, and Pierre Vernier.

It was shot at the Victorine Studios in Nice and on location around Paris, including Argenteuil where much of the film takes place. The film's sets were designed by the art director Paul-Louis Boutié.

Partial cast
 Jean Gabin as Le père Tulipe M. Martin
 Liselotte Pulver as Hilda  
 Curd Jürgens as Le Baron Edouard de Santis  
 Pierre Vernier as Noël  
 Alfred Adam as L'homme en robe de bure
 Noël Roquevert as Le patron du restaurant
 Jean Tissier as Albert  
 Mary Marquet as Dora  
 Jeanne Fusier-Gir as L'Altesse
 Serge Gainsbourg as Patrick Gérard
 Claude Nicot as Le patron d'Hilda  
 Rellys as Le cocher 
 Katrin Schaake as Patricia
 Edmond Ardisson as Un gendarme

References

Bibliography 
 Oscherwitz, Dayna & Higgins, MaryEllen. The A to Z of French Cinema. Scarecrow Press, 2009.

External links 
 

1966 films
1960s crime comedy films
French crime comedy films
German crime comedy films
West German films
1960s French-language films
Films directed by Jean-Paul Le Chanois
Constantin Film films
Films scored by Serge Gainsbourg
Films shot at Victorine Studios
Counterfeit money in film
1966 comedy films
1960s French films
1960s German films